Ledesma may refer to:

People

Arts
Alan Ledesma (actor) (1977–2008), Mexican actor
Alan Ledesma (footballer) (born 1998), Argentine footballer
Blas de Ledesma (17th century), Spanish painter
Clara Ledesma (1924–1999), Dominican painter
Inda Ledesma (1926–2010), Argentine actress and theater director
Ish Ledesma (born 1952), Cuban-American musician
José de Ledesma (1630–1670), Spanish painter
Kuh Ledesma (born 1955), Filipino jazz vocalist
Roberto  Ledesma (poet) (1901–1966), Argentinian poet
Roberto  Ledesma (singer) (born 1924), Cuban singer

Public affairs
Antonio Ledesma (born 1943), Archbishop of Cagayan de Oro, Philippines
Antonio Ledesma Jayme (1854–1937), Filipino lawmaker
Fernando Ledesma (politician) (born 1939), Spanish politician
Jesús Ledesma Aguilar (1963–2006), Mexican national executed in Texas
Ramiro Ledesma Ramos (1905–1936), Spanish politician

Sports
Aaron Ledesma (born 1971), American professional baseball player
Ángel Ledesma (born 1993), Ecuadorian football player
Arturo Ledesma (born 1988), Mexican football player
Carlos Ledesma (born 1964), Argentine football player
Christian Ledesma (born 1976), Argentine racing driver
Cristian Daniel Ledesma (born 1982), Argentine professional football player
Cristian Raúl Ledesma (born 1978), Argentine professional football player
Cristian Rolando Ledesma (born 1987), Paraguayan professional football player
Damián Ledesma (born 1982), Argentine football player
Emmanuel Ledesma (born 1988), Argentine professional football player
Ernesto Ledesma (1931–2011), Uruguayan football player
Fernando Ledesma (footballer) (born 1992), Argentine footballer 
Jorge Ledesma (born 1932), Argentine golfer
Mario Ledesma (born 1973), Argentine rugby union football player
Pablo Ledesma (born 1984), Argentine professional football player

Places
Clodomiro Ledesma, Entre Ríos, Argentina
Doñinos de Ledesma, Salamanca, Spain
La Mata de Ledesma, Salamanca, Spain
Ledesma, Salamanca, Spain
Libertador General San Martín, Jujuy, Argentina (founded and still colloquially known as "Ledesma")

Other uses
Club Martín Ledesma, football club in Paraguay
Ledesma S.A.A.I., Argentine agribusiness firm

See also
Ledezma, a similar surname